The 2021 Hull City Council election took place on 6 May 2021 to elect members of Hull City Council in England. This was on the same day as other nationwide local elections. In March 2020 the government announced that the elections scheduled for 7 May 2020 would be delayed for a year due to the COVID-19 pandemic. They were now held at the same time as the elections previously scheduled for 2021.
Following a review of Ward boundaries by the Local Government Boundary Commission for England (LGBCE) the whole council was elected in 2018, the 2nd placed winning candidate at that election is up for re-election in 2021.  The Labour Party was defending overall control of the council.

There were no elections in Central or Pickering wards, being two member wards and not being on this round of the three-year cycle.

This result had the following consequences for the total number of seats on the Council after the elections:

Results summary

Ward results

Source:

An asterisk * indicates an incumbent who stood for re-election.

Turnout figures where stated are the number of ballot papers handed out in a ward including any rejected ballot papers.

Avenue

Beverley and Newland

Boothferry

Bricknell

 

There was no election in Bricknell ward in 2019, so changes are shown from the 2018 election.

Derringham

Drypool

Holderness

Ings

Kingswood

Longhill and Bilton Grange

Marfleet

Newington and Gipsyville

North Carr

Orchard Park

Southcoates

St Andrews and Docklands

Sutton

University

There was no election in University ward in 2019, so changes are shown from the 2018 election.

West Carr

References

Hull City Council elections
2020s in Kingston upon Hull
2021 English local elections
May 2021 events in the United Kingdom